William G. Clotworthy (January 13, 1926 – August 19, 2021) was an American television censor and author. He was the censor of Saturday Night Live from 1979 to 1991. In addition to his television work, he authored several books on American history.

Books
Homes and Libraries of the Presidents (McDonald & Woodward, 1995)
Presidential Sites: A Directory of Places Associated with Presidents of the United States (University of Nebraska Press, 1996)
Saturday Night Live: Equal Opportunity Offender: The Uncensored Censor (Author House, 2001)
In the Footsteps of George Washington: A Guide to Sites Commemorating Our First President (University of Nebraska Press, 2002)
Homes of the First Ladies: A Guide to Publicly Accessible Homes, Museums, and Related Sites (McDonald & Woodward, 2010)

References

1926 births
2021 deaths
American writers